Anna Border Sheppard (born December 22, 1952) is an American politician and a Republican member of the West Virginia House of Delegates representing District 9 since her appointment by West Virginia Governor Earl Ray Tomblin June 21, 2011, to fill the vacancy caused by the death of her husband, Representative Larry Border.

Education
Border attended Parkersburg Community College (now the West Virginia University at Parkersburg), and earned her BS from West Virginia University.

Elections
2012 Border was unopposed for the May 8, 2012, Republican Primary, winning with 1,468 votes, and won the November 6, 2012, General election with 4,504 votes (65.6%) against Democratic perennial candidate Jim Marion, who has run for the seat since 2002, and in 1998 as an Independent.
On March 9, 2015, Border announced that she will be seeking the Republican nomination for President of the United States in the 2016 election.

References

External links
Official page at the West Virginia Legislature

Anna Border at Ballotpedia
Anna Border at OpenSecrets

Place of birth missing (living people)
1952 births
Living people
Republican Party members of the West Virginia House of Delegates
People from Wood County, West Virginia
West Virginia University at Parkersburg alumni
West Virginia University alumni
Women state legislators in West Virginia
21st-century American politicians
21st-century American women politicians